Bombus are a heavy metal band from Gothenburg, Sweden. Bombus initially signed to Mourningwood Recordings, releasing 3 singles and their debut album Bombus before signing to Century Media on 10 April 2013; releasing another single "Apparatus", on 6 May 2013, and their second studio album The Poet and the Parrot on 26 September 2013.

Band members

Current
 Feffe Berglund – Vocals, Guitar (2008–present)
 Peter Asp – Drums (2009–present)
 Ola Henriksson – Bass (2015–present)
 Simon Solomon – Guitar (2018–present)
 Johan Meiton – Guitar (2020–present)
Former
 Ulf Lundén – Bass (2009–2012)
 Jonas Rydberg – Bass (2012–2014)
 Matte Säker – Vocals, Guitar (2008–2020)

Discography

Studio albums
 Bombus (2010)
 The Poet and the Parrot (2013)
 Repeat Until Death (2016)
 Vulture Culture (2019)

Singles
 "Bring Me the Head of Your Dog" / "Deep River" (2009)
 "The Slaughter" / "Und So Weiter" (2009)
 "A Safe Passage" / "Cult Leader" (2011)
 "Apparatus" / "Biblical" (2013)

References

Swedish heavy metal musical groups